Narayanan, known by his stage name Sirpy (born 25 May 1962), is an Indian film score and soundtrack composer. He has predominantly scored music for Tamil films apart from working in Telugu and Malayalam films. He has also sung a few of his own compositions.

Career

Sirpy debuted as a music composer in 1992 for the film Manobala's Shenbaga Thottam and has composed for over 50 commercial and critically acclaimed feature films. His son Nandhan Ram made his acting debut as lead actor with the film Palli Paruvathile (2017).

Awards

He has won the Best Music director award from the Government of Tamil Nadu for the year 2002 for the film Unnai Ninaithu and the Kalaimamani Award in the year 1997.

Discography
Films

Television
 2018 - Chandrakumari
Singer
Yenadi Kanne (Janakiraman)
Ennai Vilai (Amman Kovil Vaasalile)
Raja Rajane (Sundara Purushan)
Indha Poonthendral (Mettukudi)
Andangakka (Namma Ooru Raasa)
Pulla Venum (Purushan Pondatti)

Filmography
{| class="wikitable"
|-  style="text-align:center; background:LightSteelBlue; width:60%;"
! Year !! Film Title !! notes
|-
|1997||Ganga Gowri||Cameo appearance in song "Kadhalare Kadhalare"<ref></re

References

External links
 

Living people
Indian male composers
Tamil Nadu State Film Awards winners
Tamil film score composers
Telugu film score composers
Malayalam film score composers
1962 births
Male film score composers